Clifford Sanford Elfelt (Chicago, Illinois, December 13, 1892 – Los Angeles, California, September 3, 1975) was an American silent film director, writer and producer. He was active in the silent film industry from 1916 up to 1926, worked with Universal Studios, was head of Metropolitan Pictures Corporation of California and had his own Clifford S. Elfelt Productions company. He was married to the actress Gladys E. Fry (1903 - 1991, also known as June LaVere), who divorced him in 1923.

Filmography

Director
 1916 Muggins (Short) 
 1916 The Cry of Conscience (Short)
 1916 The Eternal Way (Short)
 1916 For Her Mother's Sake (Short)
 1916 The Song of the Woods (Short)
 1916 Little Brownie's Bravery (Short)
 1916 Weapons of Love (Short)
 1916 A Great Love (Short)
 1922 Flaming Hearts
 1922 Big Stakes
 1923 Crimson Gold
 1923 Danger
 1924 $50,000 Reward 
 1925 Fighting Courage
 1926 Under Fire

External links

Fultonhistory.com, search for June la Vere and Clifford Elfelt
Search.ancestry.com

1892 births
1975 deaths
People from Chicago
Silent film directors
Articles containing video clips
Film directors from Illinois